{{Infobox Dogbreed

| image =Owczarek kraski 654.jpg
| image_caption = 
| name = Karst Shepherd Dog
| altname = | nickname =
| country = Slovenia
| fcistd = http://www.fci.be/uploaded_files/278gb2001_en.doc
| notrecognized=
|note =
}} 
The Karst Shepherd (  or  ) is a breed of dog of the livestock guardian type, originating in Slovenia.Kraševec Journal (ISSN C504-9644), 2009, vol. 18/19., pages 3-9 This breed is recognised by the Fédération Cynologique Internationale.

Appearance
The Karst Shepherd Dog is of medium size, harmonious, robust, endowed with a well-developed musculature and a strong constitution. The tail and ears are hanging. Length of body in proportion to height at withers should be no less than 9 : 8. Skull is a little longer than the muzzle. Width of skull is equal to its length.

Their hair is well furnished, long, flat, with abundant undercoat. The head the front edges of the ears and the front part of the legs covered with short hair. The back edge of the ears has longer and more supple hair. In its upper region, the neck has long hair, stiff and very bushy forming a mane; in its lower part, the hair is longer and more supple forming a ruff which is wider at the set of the neck. The trunk and belly have long hair which becomes less hard on the belly. The tail regularly bushy, does not form a plume. On the back side of the forequarters, the long hair is very supple forming fringes. On the back side of the hindquarters, the hair is even longer and bushy forming culottes. The length of the top coat is at least .

Coat is iron grey; especially on the back, a dark shade is preferred; towards the belly and the limbs, the colour turns without visible transition to a light grey or sandy colour, with a dark streak on the front parts of the limbs. The dark mask on the muzzle spreads on to the skull. On the back part of the head it is bordered with grey or sandy or pale fawn hair overlaid with black.

Temperament
The breed standard describes the dog as having a sharp temperament and strong individuality, distrustful of strangers. It's a good guard dog. Like all large dogs, the Karst Shepherd needs to be well socialized while very young, with people if the dog is to be a companion, and with livestock if the dog is to be a guardian. If the breed's background is taken into consideration, and if the dog is well socialized and trained, he may make a good family dog. Temperament of individual dogs may vary.

History

The Karst Shepherd is named after the Karst Plateau in Slovenia and more generally after the Karst landscape that extends to Croatia and partly in Bosnia and Herzegovina, from the Gulf of Trieste to the Dinaric Alps. Mostly bred in Slovenia and Istria in Croatia. The ancestral type of the modern day breed travelled with shepherds through this area, and most likely came with ancient nomadic pastoralists. In 1689, the ethnographer Johann Weikhard von Valvasor mentioned the shepherd's dogs of the area in his work The Glory of the Duchy of Carniola'' and described them as strong and fearless dogs from Pivka area. In the 20th century, when the landrace shepherd dogs began to be documented as a modern breed, it was first referred to as the Illyrian Shepherd (1939). Karst Shephard and Šarplaninac were considered Type A and B of the Illyrian Shepherd Dog by the Yugoslavian Federation of Cynology for some time, leading to some cases of crossing between both breeds. After comparing typical dogs of both "Types" the Federation recognised Karst Shephard and Šarplaninac as two distinct breeds in 1968.

The Fédération Cynologique Internationale recognises the breed in Group 2, Section 2.2 Molossoid breeds-Mountain type, number 278. The breed has also been exported to the United States, where it is recognised by The United Kennel Club in the Guardian Dog Group. The breed is also recognised by various minor kennel clubs and internet-based dog registry businesses, and is promoted as a rare breed for those seeking a unique pet.

During the 20th century there were several periods when the number of Karst Shephards was low. Fearing inbreeding a decision was made to introduce a single male Newfoundland into the population. The total number (including puppies, sterilised dogs and dogs not suitable for breeding) of Karst Shepherds in 2008 was estimated between 600 and 700.

A breeding program was accepted in 2009 to boost the number of dogs, improve their characteristics and preserve their genetic diversity. To avoid popular sire effect every sire can father up to 3 litters, sire must be unrelated to the dam (no common great grandparents), genetic distance between them must be higher than 0.45. Dogs with heritable diseases, atypical physical and behavioural characteristics are excluded from the program. Exceptions are possible with DLVKOS permission.

See also
 Dogs portal
 List of dog breeds
 Šarplaninac

References

External links

Home page of Slovenian National Club of Owners and Breeders of Karst Shepherds- DLVKOS- in Slovene
Information system for Karst Shepherds of Slovenia owned by DLVKOS and Faculty of Biotehnology of Ljubljana (University of Ljubljana) in Slovene

Dog breeds originating in Slovenia
FCI breeds
Livestock guardian dogs